is a Japanese–American singer-songwriter, composer, video game developer, and Twitch streamer. She is best known as the lead composer and sound designer for the tower defense game Plants vs. Zombies and the creator of the acclaimed indie RPG Rakuen.

Shigihara has worked on over 30 other published video game titles including Deltarune, World of Warcraft, To the Moon, High School Story and the 5th Anniversary Edition of Super Meat Boy. She co-created the ending theme song for Minecraft: The Story of Mojang with C418 and worked together with Yasunori Mitsuda on the official Square Enix Chrono Trigger/Chrono Cross 20th Anniversary Album.

Biography
Born to a Japanese father and a French American mother, Shigihara grew up in both the United States and Japan. She was classically trained on the piano for 11 years and taught herself guitar and drums. While studying International Relations, Business and Computer Science at the University of California, Berkeley, she was given an old version of Cakewalk (known as Sonar before 2018) which she used to start learning about mixing, arranging and production by recreating old video game soundtracks and composing her own songs. After a friend leaked her original material to record companies in Japan, Shigihara was offered record contracts as a singer there, but ended up turning them down for personal reasons.

Shortly after returning to the U.S, Shigihara took a job as the sound director for a company that produced an audio talk show and English learning materials through Apple Japan. She also released a studio album and composed her first video game soundtrack for a small casual game called Wobbly Bobbly. She stated that she would work voluntarily, and soon the company liked her work and paid her to create music for several subsequent projects. From there she built up her portfolio and has worked on over 30 published titles including Plants vs. Zombies, Deltarune, World of Warcraft, Minecraft and the indie RPG To the Moon. She participated in Akira Yamaoka's charity album Play for Japan where she contributed an original song called "Jump", alongside other composers like Nobuo Uematsu and Yasunori Mitsuda. On November 16, 2011, she released her single "Cube Land" in relation to Minecraft and Plants vs. Zombies.

Shigihara published the adventure game Rakuen in 2016.

Shigihara is a Christian.

Shigihara is a Twitch streamer who streams weekly performing songs she composed, as well as English and Japanese covers of various music genres.

Discography

Studio albums

Singles

Soundtrack albums 

Shigihara's works also include:

 Deltarune (Toby Fox/2018), arranged/performed "Don't Forget" and "Until Next Time"
 Farmer in the Sky, director, writer, composer
 Band Saga (Rekcahdam, Playism/2016), singer
 Cosmic Star Heroine (Zeboyd Games/2016), singer/lyricist "Lauren’s Song"
 Chrono Trigger & Chrono Cross Arrangement Album/Harukanaru Toki no Kanata e (Yasunori Mitsuda/2015), contributing Lyricist/Arranger/Singer
 CHUNITHM (Sega/2015), Sung "Alma's Theme" by Yasunori Mitsuda
 Penny Arcade's "On the Rain-Slick Precipice of Darkness 4" (2013), voice of MistleToe
 Minecraft: The Story of Mojang, co-created ending theme song 
 Aether (The Basement Collection) (Edmund McMillen, Tyler Glaiel/2012), original song
 Theme Park (Electronic Arts/2011), lead composer
 Ghost Harvest (Electronic Arts, 8lb Gorilla/2011), composer
 Sweet World (Kabam/2010), lead composer and sound designer
 Minesweeper (Microsoft, TG Xbox 360/2009 TBA), lead composer
 Quintessence: The Blighted Venom (Kan Gao/2009 TBA), ending theme lead vocalist
 Domino Master (Microsoft, TG Xbox 360/2008), assistant sound designer
 U.S.G. A New Beginning (GPTouch/2008), ending theme composer and lead vocalist
 Interpol 2: Most Wanted (Big Fish Games, Tikgames/2008), contributing composer
 Waterscape Solitaire: American Falls (Tikgames/2007), lead composer and sound designer
 Interpol: The Trail of Dr. Chaos (Big Fish Games, Xbox 360, Tikgames/2007-2008), lead composer and sound designer
 Mahjong Tales: Ancient Wisdom (Big Fish Games, Tikgames/2007), lead composer and sound designer
 Flowershop: Big City Break (Big Fish Games, Tikgames/2006), lead composer and sound designer
 Wobbly Bobbly (Tikgames/2006), lead composer

Notes

References

External links
 Official blog

American people of Japanese descent
American singer-songwriters
American people of French descent
Living people
Video game composers
Year of birth missing (living people)
American expatriates in Japan
21st-century American pianists
21st-century American women pianists
Women video game developers